Q114 or Q-114 may refer to:
 Quran 114,  "Mankind" (an-nās),  the last chapter of the Islamic Holy book
 Jamaica–Far Rockaway line, which consists partially of the Q114 bus line